Claudia (also known as Claudia, the Story of a Marriage) is an American television program that was broadcast live on NBC January 6, 1952 - March 23, 1952 and on CBS March 31, 1952 - June 30, 1952. The situation comedy was based on Rose Franken's short stories and novels about a young woman's romance.

Premise
At age 18, Claudia Brown, a somewhat naive teenage girl, married David Naughton, an architect. Adapted from the radio series Claudia and David, episodes focused on their lives, especially Claudia's struggles as she adjusted to married life. The concept was also adapted into the Broadway play Claudia (1941) and the films Claudia (1943) and Claudia and David (1946). 
In addition to Claudia and David, story lines involved David's brother and sister (Harley and Julia) and Claudia's mother (Mrs. Brown).

Cast
The program's actors and the characters that they portrayed are shown in the table below.

Source: Encyclopedia of Television Shows, 1925 through 2010, except as noted.

Attempted revival
In 1956, Franken tried to launch a new version of the program. Several entities showed interest in the project, and two pilot episodes were made, but the efforts were unsuccessful.

References 
 

1952 American television series debuts
1952 American television series endings
1950s American sitcoms
NBC original programming
CBS original programming